Conversin' with the Elders is the fourth album by saxophonist  James Carter recorded in late 1995 and early 1996 and released on the Atlantic label. The album features guest appearances by veteran musicians, including trumpeters Harry "Sweets" Edison and Lester Bowie, and saxophonists Hamiet Bluiett, Larry Smith and Buddy Tate.

Reception

AllMusic awarded the album 3½ stars with its review by Scott Yanow stating, "Switching between tenor, alto, baritone and bass clarinet, Carter makes each of his guests feel at home while pushing them to stretch themselves. A consistently colorful and generally swing-oriented set". Critic Robert Christgau rated the album an "A" saying, "A jazz album, absolutely. But one any rock and roller who can abide a saxophone could love".

Track listing
 "Freereggaehibop" (Lester Bowie) - 8:10
 "Parker's Mood" (Charlie Parker) - 6:29
 "Lester Leaps In" (Lester Young) - 4:57
 "Naima" (John Coltrane) - 7:09
 "Blue Creek" (Buddy Tate) - 6:13
 "Centrepiece" (Harry "Sweets" Edison, John Handy) - 6:35
 "Composition #40Q" (Anthony Braxton) - 6:41
 "Moten Swing" (Bennie Moten, Buster Moten) - 7:44
 "Atitled Valse" (James Carter) - 8:22  
Recorded at Power Station, NYC on October 2, 1995 (tracks 1 & 9), January 30, 1996 (tracks 3, 5, 6 & 8) and February 5, 1996 (tracks 2, 4 & 7)

Personnel
James Carter - tenor saxophone, alto saxophone, baritone saxophone, bass clarinet
Craig Taborn - piano 
Jaribu Shahid - bass
Tani Tabbal - drums
Lester Bowie (tracks 1 & 9), Harry "Sweets" Edison (tracks 3 & 6) - trumpet 
Larry Smith - alto saxophone (track 2)
Buddy Tate - tenor saxophone (tracks 5 & 8)
Hamiet Bluiett - baritone saxophone (tracks 4 & 7)

References 

1996 albums
James Carter (musician) albums
Atlantic Records albums